Niterói: Revista Brasileira (Portuguese for Niterói: Brazilian Magazine) was a magazine created in 1836 by three of the most prominent Brazilian writers at the time: Gonçalves de Magalhães, Manuel de Araújo Porto-Alegre and Francisco de Sales Torres Homem. It was edited in Paris, France.

Only two issues of the magazine were published before it became defunct.

Historical
During the Regency period (1831–1840) of Brazil, the country saw a boom on the publication of periodicals. Due to the historical circumstances of the consolidation of institutions, politics and the own national territory, most of the periodicals at the time had political themes. Niterói, however, was an exception, since it discussed sciences, arts and literature. It is now considered to be a forerunner of the Romantic movement in Brazil.

Editions
The magazine discussed numerous themes, from comets to the slavist economy of Brazil. In the first issue, Gonçalves de Magalhães published a manifesto named Discurso Sobre a História da Literatura no Brasil, in which he exposed to the Brazilian nation the ideals of the then-new Romantic movement.

Niteróis initial print run was very limited and the magazine's activity ceased down after Gonçalves de Magalhães was fired from his post at the Brazilian legation in France and had to return to Brazil due to divergences with its chief, Luís Moutinho.

Notes

External links
 The two issues of Niterói available for reading 
 ANDRADE, Débora El-Jaick. Semeando os alicerces da nação: História, nacionalidade e cultura nas páginas da revista Niterói 

1836 establishments in France
1836 disestablishments in France
Defunct literary magazines published in France
Magazines established in 1836
Magazines disestablished in 1836
Magazines published in Paris
Portuguese-language magazines
Romanticism